Augustin Berque (born 1942 in Rabat, Morocco), is a French geographer, Orientalist and philosopher. He is the son of the famous Egyptologist Jacques Berque. He is professor at the École des hautes études en sciences sociales in Paris (EHESS). His specialist field of interest is Japan.

Concepts 

Berque has developed an extensive array of concepts in order to grasp the complex nature of relations between natural and physical objects and the way we conceive of nature. He insists on intermediation, introducing a new concept. His more theoretical work relies on the concept of oecumene, which he uses after Plato and quite distinctly from the sense proposed by Derrida. He has also worked on landscapes by comparing the different visions of the world that are mirrored by a specific landscape.

Major works 

Augustin Berque's work has not been widely translated into English.

 Le Sauvage et l'Artifice. Les Japonais devant la nature, 1986, Paris, Gallimard, 314 pp. ("Japan: Nature, Artifice and Japanese Culture", 1997, Yelvertoft Manor, Pilkington, 231 pp.)
 Du geste à la cité. Formes urbaines et lien social au Japon, 1993, Paris, Gallimard, 247 pp.
 Être humains sur la terre. Principes d'éthique de l'écoumène, 1996, Paris, Gallimard, 212 pp.
 Écoumène. Introduction à l'étude des milieux humains, 2001, Paris, Belin, 271 pp.
 Histoire de l'habitat idéal - De l'Orient vers l'Occident, 2010, Paris, Félin, 396 pp.
 Milieu et identité humaine. Notes pour un dépassement de la modernité  (Milieu and human identity: Notes towards a surpassing of modernity), 2010, Paris: Editions Donner Lieu. 148 pp. .

Prizes 
 2011: Japan Foundation Award.
 2013: honoris causa doctorate from the Université Laval (Canada).
 2017: honoris causa doctorate from the University of Lausanne (Switzerland).
 2018: International Cosmos Prize.

References

External links 
 Publications of Augustin Berque, official site in French (RTF format)
 Book review in English on his latest work
 All his seminars are available on-line: Mésologiques

French geographers
1942 births
Living people
People from Rabat
Academic staff of the School for Advanced Studies in the Social Sciences
French orientalists
20th-century French philosophers
French male non-fiction writers
Members of Academia Europaea
21st-century French philosophers